Namibia women's national inline hockey team is the national team for Namibia. The team competed in the 2013 Women's World Inline Hockey Championships.

References 

National inline hockey teams
Inline hockey
Inline hockey in Namibia